William Bludworth is a fictional character in the Final Destination film series, portrayed by Tony Todd. He appears in Final Destination, Final Destination 2, and Final Destination 5. William Bludworth is the owner of Bludworth Funeral Homes and has the most knowledge of Death and its forces or capacities, and can basically be seen as the Grim Reaper throughout.

Films

Final Destination (2000) 
In the first film, Alex Browning and Clear Rivers sneak inside the morgue to glimpse at Tod Waggner's corpse. Bludworth catches them in the act and asks why they came. Offering his help, he explains to them the rule of Death: those who cheat death will be revisited by Death once more to claim back their lives which should've been lost. He also tells them about Death's list (a list of the order of deaths of the survivors in the original incident) and how it will work on them once again. Finally, he states that ruining the list can affect the remaining survivors. Bludworth claims that if Alex and Clear can figure out death's design, then they may have a chance to beat it. He warns them about the consequences of tampering with the design however by telling them, "beware the risk of cheating the plan, disrespecting the design...could initiate a horrifying fury that would terrorize even the Grim Reaper...and you don't even want to fuck with that mack daddy."

Final Destination 2 (2003) 
In the second film, Bludworth is revisited by Clear, together with Kimberly Corman and Thomas Burke, to obtain help about cheating death. He is seen de-accessorizing the corpse of Evan Lewis. However, he only mentions to them the rule of life and death: new life can defeat Death.

Final Destination 5 (2011) 
Despite being absent from the third and fourth films, Bludworth reappears in the fifth film. In this film, he is seen as a coroner who the characters encounter several times, and informs them only that by taking a life can they live, for they will receive the lifespan of the person they've killed. The point they neglect to realize however is that they have no way of knowing how long the person they would kill has to live on their remaining lifespan.

Casting 

Tony Todd, who played Candyman in the 1992 film Candyman, was cast as mortician William Bludworth. Writer Glen Morgan initially wanted Todd for the role for his deep voice that would give the film an eerie tone.

Reception 
Todd's performance in Final Destination has received positive reviews among critics. Joe Leydon of Variety complimented his performance, saying that "Todd --- an old hand at scary stories after the "Candyman" series --- overplays with enough relish to position himself as a probable returnee for a Final Destination 2.". Brett Gallman of Oh, The Horror! described Todd's wry and sinister portrayal "has crafted one of the genre's most memorable characters in recent memory
though he's only appeared twice for about five total minutes in the series."

On the other hand, Todd's role in Final Destination 2 received mixed reviews among critics, most complaining about Todd's minimal screentime. Robert Koehler of Variety remarked that Todd's "single, distinctly flat scene" was wasted by the filmmakers. Gallman of Oh, The Horror! is enticed by Todd's role "whose purpose has still yet to be revealed in the franchise."

References

External links 
 William Bludworth on IMDb

Fictional African-American people
Fictional characters from New York (state)
Final Destination characters
Film characters introduced in 2000
Male horror film characters